The Wampanoag Tribe of Gay Head (Aquinnah) is a federally recognized tribe of Wampanoag people based in the town of Aquinnah on the southwest tip of Martha's Vineyard in Massachusetts. The tribe hosts an annual Cranberry Day celebration.

The tribe received official recognition in 1987, the same year that their land claim on Martha's Vineyard was settled by an act of Congress, with agreement by the state and the United States Department of Interior. The government took into trust on behalf of the tribe 485 acres of Tribal Lands purchased (160 acres private and approximately 325 acres common lands). In 2011 the state of Massachusetts passed a law allowing legalized gambling, and federally recognized Native American tribes began to develop proposals to develop casinos.

Faced with state opposition to a Class III facility on its land, in 2013 the Wampanoag Tribe of Gay Head proposed a Class II facility to be developed on its property. The state and town filed suit against it in federal district court, and the judge ruled in their favor.  The tribe, together with the Department of Interior, appealed to the US Court of Appeals, First Circuit, defending its case in December 2016.

Government
The Wampanoag Tribe of Gay Head is governed by an elected eleven-member council. The current administration is as follows.

 Chairman: Cheryl Andrews-Maltais
 Vice-chairman: Richard Randolph
 Treasurer: Stephanie White
 Secretary: Eleanor Hebert
 Council: Naomi Carney
 Council: Alvin Clark Jr.
 Council: Steven Craddock

 Council: Kristina Hook
 Council: Keith Marden
 Council: Daniel Vainshtein
 Council: Leigh Vanderhoop
 Honorary Tribal Chief: F. Ryan Malonson
 Honorary Tribal Medicine Man: Jason Baird

The tribe's honorary tribal chief and the medicine man are hereditary positions held for life.

Economic development
The Aquinnah Wampanoag tribe operates a shellfish hatchery on Menemsha Pond, cultivating oysters. Tourism is also very important to the tribe. Many tribal members own their own businesses, while others have had to move off island for employment.

History

Wampanoag people have lived in the area of Aquinnah, Massachusetts, for millennia. Traditionally, they fished, grew crops, and hunted whales. English people began settling in the region in large numbers by the 17th and 18th centuries, encroaching on Wampanoag lands. Over time the Wampanoag were dispossessed of their lands. Some intermarried with English colonists and later European-American generations. As the Wampanoag had a matrilineal kinship system, they considered all children born to their women to be Wampanoag. They carried on their culture this way. Descent and inheritance passed through the women's lines.

In the nineteenth century, most Wampanoag men worked in the whaling industry on board ships. Some advanced in rank; for instance, Amos Hoskins became master of the Massasoit in 1851. (See photo above)

20th century
In 1972, the Wampanoag people on the island formed the Wampanoag Tribal Council of Gay Head, Inc. for cultural preservation and political self-determination. It filed a land claim suit in 1974, seeking to gain title to 3,000 acres of lands lost to the state and town. In the nineteenth century, these bodies had not gained federal approval through the Senate for extinguishment of Wampanoag title, as required under the 1790 Non-Intercourse Act. The Wampanoag claimed part of the public lands in the Town of Gay Head (now Aquinnah). The suit was controversial, clouding title to other lands in the town.

The US federal government formally recognized the Wampanoag Tribe of Gay Head (Aquinnah) on 10 April 1987. Under the Massachusetts Indian Land Claim Settlement Act of 1987, the federal government agreed to take into trust on behalf of the tribe approximately 485 acres of Tribal Lands purchased (160 acres private and approximately 325 acres common lands). The Town of Aquinnah contributed some land and the state of Massachusetts contributed up to $2,250,000 to a fund so that the Wampanoag could acquire land to be held for communal purposes. Common lands include the Gay Head Cliffs, Herring Creek, and Lobsterville. The private lands are in several parcels. Other land owned by the Tribe includes parcels in Christiantown and Chappaquiddick, both on the island. The settlement provides details as to responsibilities and jurisdiction.

Since that time, in 1988 the Congress passed the Indian Gaming Regulatory Act, to establish a regulatory framework for gaming on Native American lands within the jurisdiction of federally recognized tribes. As required by law, the Tribe soon submitted its proposed gaming ordinance to the National Indian Gaming Commission (NIGC).

21st century
The tribe withdrew its earlier proposed gaming ordinance, submitting an amended form in May 2013. By letter dated 23 August 2013, the Solicitor of the Department of Interior responded to an inquiry by the National Indian Gaming Commission (NIGC) and said that the Wampanoag were not prohibited by the terms of their 1987 Settlement Act from applying for approval of gaming on their lands, in accordance with state laws.

The tribe has pulled back from an earlier proposal to develop a Class III gaming casino on its land, to which the state had objected. The state said the tribe was limited to local zoning on its land based on the 1987 settlement agreement.

The state had been working to license privately developed casinos in three regions of the state. This plan included negotiating with the Mashpee Wampanoag Tribe for a casino to be developed in Taunton, Massachusetts, which the tribe had acquired. This project was challenged in federal district court by opponents in February 2016 based on language defining Indian tribes recognized by the government in the Indian Reorganization Act of 1934. It has been appealed to the US Court of Appeals, First Circuit, for exploration of the definitions.

The governor and other parties opposed approving a Class III casino to be developed by the Wampanoag tribe on the Vineyard. As of 2014, the Gay Head Wampanoag proposed to adapt an existing building for a Class II boutique casino. It was challenged in federal district court in a suit by the state, joined by the Town of Aquinnah.

In June 2016 the US District Court ruled against the tribe. Judge J. Dennis Saylor IV said that the tribe was subject to state and local regulation of gambling. In addition, he determined that the Wampanoag Tribe of Gay Head (Aquinnah) did not have "sufficient governmental control" over its reservation to manage a casino. "Mr. Rappaport explained that this referred to the tribe’s lack of police (they have only conservation rangers), ambulance service, firefighting staff, or any jurisdiction over the behavior of nontribe members on tribal property. Should anything go wrong at the casino, the Town of Aquinnah was neither willing nor able to assume those responsibilities."

The federal government has sided with the tribe, keeping the issue alive. Saying there were "material errors" in the judge's decision, the tribe appealed the ruling to the US Appeals Court, First Circuit in December 2016, with support of the US Department of Interior.

In February 2019, the tribe announced it will begin construction of the Aquinnah Cliffs Casino in March 2019. The Wampanoag Tribe of Gay Head is scheduled proceed with construction despite opposition from the towns of Aquinnah and Chilmark, and a request from the Martha's Vineyard Commission for the Wampanoag tribe to work with the commission to "preserve the unique values of the Vineyard." The Wampanoag tribe says the commission has no jurisdiction over the project.

Notable Aquinnah Wampanoag people 
 Helen Manning, writer, education director, activist, historian
 Gladys Widdiss, tribal elder in Aquinnah reservation

See also 
 Native American tribes in Massachusetts

Notes

References 
 Pritzker, Barry M. A Native American Encyclopedia: History, Culture, and Peoples. Oxford: Oxford University Press, 2000.

External links
 Wampanoag Tribe of Aquinnah , official website

 
Aquinnah, Massachusetts
Federally recognized tribes in the United States
Native American tribes in Massachusetts
Martha's Vineyard
History of Dukes County, Massachusetts
Native American history of Massachusetts